Class 14 may refer to:

The British Rail Class 14, a British diesel locomotive class
The DRG Class 14, a German steam locomotive class operated by the Deutsche Reichsbahn with a 4-4-2 ("Atlantic") wheel arrangement. These were the:
 Class 14.0: Prussian S 8 and S 9
 Class 14.1: Palatine P 3 and Bavarian S 2/5
 Class 14.2: Saxon X V
 Class 14.3: Saxon X H1